Kakka Kakka is an Indian soap opera starring Deepa, Jeeva Ravi, Suzane George, Kamal and SVS Kumar. It aired Monday to Friday at 6:30PM IST on Raj TV from 7 September 2016 to  10 January 2017 for 127 episodes. The title song of the serial is sung by the famous Playback Singer and Carnatic Music senior Vocalist Dr. Nithyasree Mahadevan. It had been receiving the highest ratings of Tamil serials and received high praising from viewers.

Cast
 Deepa Jayan
 Jeeva Ravi
 Suzane George
 Kamal
 SVS Kumar 
 Bharathy Mokan
 Saravanan
 Dharaj
 Poorni
 Yasotha
 Jerad Noel
 Jayashila
 Sabitha Raj
 Akil
 CD
 Kishan

Original soundtrack

Title song
It was written by lyricist DR. Kiruthika, composed by the music director Hari Krushna. The title song of the serial is sung by the Playback Singer and Carnatic Music senior Vocalist Dr. Nithyasree Mahadevan.

Soundtrack

Filming

The first schedule of filming was held in Sri Lanka (Bandaranaike International Airport, Colombo, Kataragama temple, Kataragama temple, Selva Sannidhi Murugan Temple, Burning of Jaffna library, Burning of Jaffna library, Maruthanamadam Anjaneyar Temple).

The Second schedule of filming was held in Tamil Nadu (Thiruchendur, Thiruchendur Murugan Temple and Palani).

See also
 Kanda Shasti Kavasam

References

External links
 Raj TV Official Site 

Raj TV television series
Tamil-language thriller television series
2016 Tamil-language television series debuts
Tamil-language television shows
2017 Tamil-language television series endings